Alexander Pushkin (1799–1837) was a Russian poet.

Pushkin may also refer to:

Places
 Pushkin, Saint Petersburg, a town in Pushkinsky District of Saint Petersburg, Russia

 Pushkin Airport, an airfield near Saint Petersburg, Russia
 Biləsuvar, Azerbaijan, formerly Pushkin
 Pushkin (Tashkent Metro), a railway station in Tashkent, Uzbekistan
 Pushkin High School, in Berezniki, Russia
 Pushkin Park, in Saransk, Mordovia, Russia

People with the surname
 Aleksei Musin-Pushkin (1744–1817), Russian statesman, historian, and art collector
 Valentin Musin-Pushkin (1735–1804), Russian military officer and government official 
 Ales Pushkin (born 1965), Belarusian artist, performer, and political prisoner
 Alexander Pushkin (ballet dancer) (1907–1970), Russian ballet master
 Apollo Mussin-Pushkin (1760–1805), Russian chemist and plant collector
 Boris Pushkin (c. 1590–1659), Russian diplomat and officeholder
 Georgy Pushkin (1909–1963), Soviet ambassador and politician
 Mike Pushkin, American politician
 Natalia Pushkina (1812–1863), Alexander Pushkin's wife
 Vasily Pushkin (1766–1830), Russian poet and Aleksander Pushkin's uncle

Fictional characters
 Dimitri Pushkin, or Rocket Red, a DC Comics superhero
 General Pushkin, the head of the KGB in the 1987 film The Living Daylights
 Vladimir Pushkin, the main antagonist in the 2014 film The Equalizer

Other uses
 Pushkin: The Last Duel, a 2006 Russian film
 Pushkin Industries, an American podcast and audiobook publisher
 Pushkin Institute, a Russian-language education center in Moscow
 Pushkin Museum, a fine arts museum in Moscow
 Pushkin Press, a British-based publishing house 
 Pushkin Prize, a Russian literary prize
 Alexander Pushkin (Bourganov), a statue in Washington D.C., US
 Alexander Pushkin (diamond), a large gem discovered in 1989
 MS Alexandr Pushkin, an ocean liner
 "Pushkin", a 1994 song by Will Oldham from Days in the Wake

See also
 Pushkin House (disambiguation)
 Pushkin Street (disambiguation)
 Pushkino (disambiguation)
 Pushkinsky (disambiguation)

Russian-language surnames
Surnames of Russian origin